Chiloglottis sphaerula is a species of orchid endemic to a small part of New South Wales. It has two dark green leaves and a single green to reddish pink flower with a shiny black insect-like callus covering two-thirds of the base of the labellum but with the tip of the labellum free of callus.

Description
The remaining one-third of the tip of the labellum is devoid of calli. Flowering occurs from December to February.

Taxonomy
Chiloglottis sphaerula was first formally described in 2006 by David Jones from a specimen collected in the Barrington Tops National Park and the description was published in Australian Orchid Research. The specific epithet (sphaerula) is a Latin word meaning "ball" referring to the shape of the "head" of the insect-like callus.

This species was formerly known as Chiloglottis sp. aff. sphyrnoides (Northern Tablelands).

Distribution and habitat
This orchid grows in tall, moist forest on the southern part of the Northern Tablelands and Barrington Tops National Park.

References

External links 

sphaerula
Orchids of New South Wales
Plants described in 2006